Cheyenne van den Goorbergh (born 6 September 1997) is a Dutch professional footballer who plays as a midfielder for Eredivisie club Feyenoord.

International career
On 2 March 2018, van den Goorbergh made her senior team debut for Netherlands by scoring a goal in a 3–2 win against Denmark.

Career statistics

International

Scores and results list Netherlands' goal tally first, score column indicates score after each van den Goorbergh goal.

Honours
Twente
Winner
 BeNe League (1): 2013–14
 KNVB Women's Cup (1): 2014–15
 Eredivisie (2): 2015–16, 2018–19
Runner-up
 BeNe League (1): 2014–15
 Eredivisie (2): 2016–17, 2017–18
Netherlands
Winner
 Algarve Cup (1): 2018

References

External links
Senior national team profile at Onsoranje.nl (in Dutch)
Under-23 national team profile at Onsoranje.nl (in Dutch)
Under-19 national team profile at Onsoranje.nl (in Dutch)
Under-17 national team profile at Onsoranje.nl (in Dutch)
Under-16 national team profile at Onsoranje.nl (in Dutch)
Under-15 national team profile at Onsoranje.nl (in Dutch)

1997 births
Living people
Dutch women's footballers
Sportspeople from Voorburg
Women's association football midfielders
Netherlands women's international footballers
Footballers from South Holland
FC Twente (women) players
PEC Zwolle (women) players
Feyenoord (women) players